Île Chevreau also known as Île Bonhomme is an island off the north coast of Saint Barthélemy in the Caribbean. It is the westernmost most of a series of islands.  It is mainly rocky, with some sparse areas of vegetation towards the centre and western side. With an area of 62 hectares, it is the second largest satellite island of Saint Barthélemy after Île Fourchue.

References

Islands of Saint Barthélemy
Chevreau